The British University of Bahrain (BUB) is a private university located in Saar, in the Kingdom of Bahrain. Established in 2018 in partnership with the University of Salford in Manchester, it awards undergraduate British degrees in the country.

Academic programmes
The programmes being offered at the British University of Bahrain are exactly identical to the ones being offered at the University of Salford. There is a College of Business,  College of Engineering and Built Environment, and College of Information and Communication Technology; each with several bachelor's degrees offered.

Campus
BUB is located in a purpose-built ten storey building in the Saar area of Bahrain. The campus includes a 424-seater auditorium, a high-tech learning resource centre, contemporary recreational and work spaces as well as more than fifty classrooms, workshops, and laboratories. The campus is located adjacent to a shopping mall, which offers students a wide range of additional facilities, including a hyper-market, 13-screen cinema complex, and a wide range of retail outlets, cafes, restaurants, and recreational facilities. The university also serves as a testing centre for the IELTS exam.

References

2018 establishments in Bahrain
Universities in Bahrain
Educational institutions established in 2018